Martin Kukk (born on 15 August 1987 in Rakvere) is an Estonian politician. He is a member of XIII Riigikogu.

In 2013, he graduated from Estonian Academy of Security Sciences, studying taxation.

Since 2007, he has been a member of the Estonian Reform Party. From 6 April 2011 to 15 January 2016, Kukk was Secretary General of the Reform Party

References

Living people
1987 births
Estonian Reform Party politicians
Members of the Riigikogu, 2015–2019